Countdown to Doom is a text adventure game written by Peter Killworth for the BBC Micro and published by Acornsoft in 1982. It is set on the planet Doomawangara, which is coyly shortened to "Doom". An Acorn Electron version was released in 1984 but only as a ROM cartridge for the Plus 1 expansion. This was the only game released exclusively as a ROM cart for the Electron. There are two sequels, both published by Topologika: Return to Doom and Last Days of Doom.

Topologika rereleased Countdown to Doom in 1987, expanding the scope of the game by about 50%. It was published for the BBC Micro, Acorn Electron, ZX Spectrum, IBM PC compatibles, Amstrad CPC, Amstrad PCW, Atari ST, and RM Nimbus. A RISC OS version was published in a compilation with Return to Doom and Philosopher's Quest.

Plot
The player's spaceship crash-lands on Doom's inhospitable surface and they emerge from the wreckage to realise that, unless they can locate the necessary spare parts, their ship will corrode away in a mere 400 time units.

External links
 
 Countdown to Doom at Spectrum Computing

1980s interactive fiction
1982 video games
Acorn Archimedes games
Acornsoft games
Amstrad CPC games
Amstrad PCW games
Atari ST games
BBC Micro and Acorn Electron games
DOS games
Video games developed in the United Kingdom
ZX Spectrum games
Single-player video games